Rupert Wells is a South African rugby league footballer for the Tuks Bulls. His position is wing. He is a South African international, and has played in the 2013 Rugby League World Cup qualifying against Jamaica and the USA He represented South Africa in the Middle East-Africa play-offs for the 2017 Rugby League World Cup.

References

Wells
Wells
Tuks Bulls players
Rugby league wingers